The qualification for the 1976 Women's Olympic Handball Tournament assigned quota places to six teams: the host, four teams from the world championships and one team from the qualification tournament respectively.

Qualification

Modus
The IHF proposed that the host and the top five from the last world championships (WC) would qualify. The USA proposed that besides the host only the top four from the WC would qualify. The last spot would be given to the winner of an additional tournament. At this tournament, the champions from Africa, America, and Asia would attend. Finland proposed that the sixth place would be given to the winner of a game between the 5th place team at the WC and the winner of a tournament between the champions from Africa, America, and Asia.

France presented the following arguments for the American proposal:
The Olympic thought is that all continents are represented
It would be great propaganda for handball on these continents
It's not technical risk. Because the level of Japan is good enough and they would most likely win the qualification tournament.

The proposal from the USA received 25 votes, from Finland 12 votes, and the proposal from the IHF 10 votes.

Legend for qualification type

World Championship

Qualification tournament 

The 1976 IHF Olympic qualification tournament was held in the United States. The winner of the tournament qualified for the 1976 Summer Olympics. Japan represented Asia, Tunisia represented Africa and the United States represented America.

Qualification

Standings

Matches
All times are local (UTC-5).

References

External links 
  Women Handball Intercontinental Olympic Qualification 1976 Milwakee (USA) 

Women's qualification
Handball Women
Olympics